Voltigeurs de Châteaubriant is a French association football club based in the commune of Châteaubriant, Loire-Atlantique. As of the 2020–21 season the men's team competes in the National 2, the fourth tier of French football, having won promotion in the truncated 2019–20 season. The club plays their home matches at the Stade de la Ville en Bois, which has a capacity of 3,000.

History
Voltigeurs de Châteaubriant was founded in 1907, and the football section appeared around 1920. Originally the club also had gymnastics and tennis sections, but these are no longer active.

The football team has played in regional leagues for the vast majority of its existence, with varying levels of success. Châteaubriant won the Division d'Honneur (DH) Ouest in 1958 but declined promotion to the next tier, allowing Stade Brestois 29 to be promoted in their place. This was to be their only league title until 1991, when the club won the DH Atlantique, thereby gaining promotion to Division 4, the equivalent of the current CFA. In 1993, as part of the restructuring of the French league system, the club was moved to the newly formed National 3, the fifth tier of the pyramid. Relegation back to the regional divisions followed in 1997.

The 2013–14 and 2014–15 seasons saw Châteaubriant achieve successive promotions, winning the DH Atlantique and then the CFA2 Group A, to return to the fourth level of French football for the first time in over 20 years. After two seasons, they were relegated to the newly formed Championnat National 3 in 2017.

In the 2019–20 season, Châteaubriant were at the top of Group B of the National 3 table when the season was truncated due to the COVID-19 pandemic. They were declared as promoted to National 2 when the season was officially ended.

In March 2021, the club reached the round of 16 in the Coupe de France for the first time in their history.

Current squad
.

Honours
.
 Division d'Honneur Ouest: 1957–58 
 Division d'Honneur Atlantique: 1990–91, 2003–04, 2013–14
 Championnat de France Amateur 2 Group A: 2014–15

References

Football clubs in France
Association football clubs established in 1907
1907 establishments in France
Football clubs in Loire-Atlantique